Glabrella is a genus of flowering plants belonging to the family Gesneriaceae.

Its native range is Southern China.

Species:

Glabrella leiophylla 
Glabrella longipes 
Glabrella mihieri

References

Gesneriaceae
Gesneriaceae genera